The grey-crowned mannikin (Lonchura nevermanni), or grey-crowned munia,  is a species of estrildid finch of southern New Guinea. It has an estimated global extent of occurrence of 20,000 to 50,000 km2.

It is found in moist savanna & wetlands habitats. The status of the species is evaluated as Least Concern.

References

BirdLife Species Factsheet

grey-crowned mannikin
Birds of New Guinea
grey-crowned mannikin